WIND Telecom, S.A. is a telecommunications company in the Dominican Republic which operates networks for wireless Internet over WiMAX, VoIP telephony, and cable over MMDS in the Dominican Republic.

History 
On January 29, 2010 WIND announced a partnership with Samsung Electronics to build out their WiMAX network. On November 29, 2010 WIND launched their WiMAX network in Santiago. On March 30, 2011 WIND announced their network buildout had been completed.

In June 2014, media announced the deployment of a TDD-LTE based network built by ZTE.

Services

Consumer 
WIND Telecom provides bundled services under the WIND brand. These bundles offer discounts on their Television, Internet, and Telephone services.

Internet is provided over WiMAX. As of December 2012, their available speeds are as follows.

Enterprise 
WIND offers symmetric and asymmetric Internet over WiMAX as well as Internet Backhaul over fibre or microwave. WIND also provides SIP telephone, television, and virtual fax services.

Notes

External links 

 

Telecommunications companies of the Dominican Republic
2008 establishments in the Dominican Republic
Telecommunications companies established in 2008